Spaghetti squash or vegetable spaghetti is a group of cultivars of Cucurbita pepo subsp. pepo. They are available in a variety of shapes, sizes, and colours, including ivory, yellow and orange, with orange having the highest amount of carotene. Its center contains many large seeds. When raw, the flesh is solid and similar to other raw squash. When cooked, the meat of the fruit falls away from the flesh in ribbons or strands that look like and can be used as an alternative to, spaghetti.

Preparation 
Spaghetti squash can be cooked in a variety of ways, including baking, boiling, steaming, or microwaving. Once cooked the flesh of this fruit can be prepared in a way that its “strands” look like and are as long as traditional spaghetti noodles. It can be served with or without sauce as a substitute for pasta, and its seeds can be roasted, similar to pumpkin seeds.

Nutrition 
Spaghetti squash contains many nutrients, including folic acid, potassium, and beta carotene.  It is low in calories, averaging 42 calories per 1-cup (155 grams) serving.

Cultivation 

Spaghetti squash is relatively easy to grow, thriving in gardens or pots.

The plants are monoecious, with male and female flowers on the same plant. Male flowers have long, thin stems that extend upwards from the vine. Female flowers are shorter, with a small round growth underneath the petals. This round growth turns into the squash if the flower is successfully pollinated.

References

External links

 

Squashes and pumpkins